Borsonia symbiophora is a species of sea snail, a marine gastropod mollusk in the family Borsoniidae.

Description
The size of the shell attains 70 mm.

Distribution
This marine species occurs off the Solomon Islands.

References

 Sysoev, A. V. "Deep-sea conolidean gastropods collected by the John Murray Expedition, 1933-34." Bulletin of the Natural History Museum Zoology Series 62 (1996): 1-30.

External links
 MNHN, Paris: Borsonia symbiophora

symbiophora
Gastropods described in 1996